Wesenberg is a railway station  in the town of Wesenberg, Mecklenburg-Vorpommern, Germany.

Train services
The station is served by the following services:

regional service (Hanseatische Eisenbahn) Neustrelitz - Mirow

References

Railway stations in Germany opened in 1890
Buildings and structures in Mecklenburgische Seenplatte (district)
Railway stations in Mecklenburg-Western Pomerania